Herman Dammann (April 2, 1888 – March 15, 1968) was a farmer and politician.

Dammann was born in Minnesota and lived in Plato, McLeod County, Minnesota. He was a farmer and cattle breeder. He served in the Minnesota House of Representatives from 1925 until 1942.

References

1888 births
1968 deaths
People from McLeod County, Minnesota
Farmers from Minnesota
Members of the Minnesota House of Representatives